Earthquakes in Fiji are infrequent and are sometimes accompanied by tsunami. The group of islands are positioned at the Australian–Pacific plate margin.

References

Sources

Earthquakes in Fiji
Fiji
Earthquakes
Tsunamis in Fiji